Valeri Viktorovich Ovchinnikov (born 26 November 1947) is a Russian professional football coach. As of 2009, he works as a vice-president of FC Levadia Tallinn.

External links
 

1947 births
People from Sakhalin Oblast
Living people
Soviet footballers
Association football goalkeepers
Soviet football managers
Russian football managers
FC Tyumen managers
FC Spartak Vladikavkaz managers
FC Lokomotiv Nizhny Novgorod managers
Russian Premier League managers
FC Volgar Astrakhan managers
FC Sodovik Sterlitamak managers
Recipients of the Medal of the Order "For Merit to the Fatherland" II class
Sportspeople from Sakhalin Oblast